The individual jumping event, part of the equestrian program at the 2004 Summer Olympics, was held from 22 August to 24 August 2004 in the Olympic Equestrian Centre on the outskirts of Markopoulo in the Attica region of Greece.  Like all other equestrian events, the jumping competition was mixed gender, with both male and female athletes competing in the same division.

Medalists

Results

References

Team jumping